Toni Tetzlaff (born Elisabeth Antonie Pauline Tetzlaff; 13 March 1871 – 16 December 1947) was a German stage and film actress.

Selected filmography

 Alkohol (1919)
 Lilli (1919)
 Lilli's Marriage (1919)
 The World Champion (1919)
 Devoted Artists (1919)
 Princess Woronzoff (1920)
 In the Whirl of Life (1920)
 The Adventuress of Monte Carlo (1921)
 Waves of Life and Love (1921)
 Lola Montez, the King's Dancer (1922)
 Louise de Lavallière (1922)
 Should We Get Married? (1925)
 Reluctant Imposter (1925)
 The Ascent of Little Lilian (1925)
 The Three Mannequins (1926)
 Lace (1926)
 Countess Ironing-Maid (1926)
 His Greatest Bluff (1927)
 Heads Up, Charley (1927)
 Love in the Cowshed (1928)
 Panic (1928)
 Immorality (1928)
 When the Mother and the Daughter (1928)
 From a Bachelor's Diary (1929)
 The Woman Everyone Loves Is You (1929)
 Sinful and Sweet (1929)
 Fräulein Else (1929)
 Jenny's Stroll Through Men (1929)
 Hans in Every Street (1930)
 The Woman Without Nerves (1930)
 Busy Girls (1930)
 End of the Rainbow (1930)
 That's All That Matters (1931)
 Queen of the Night (1931)
 Elisabeth of Austria (1931)
 The Concert (1931)
 Waves of Life and Love (1921)
 Spoiling the Game (1932)
 Madame Makes Her Exit (1932)
 So Ended a Great Love (1934)
 I for You, You for Me (1934)
 Playing with Fire (1934)
 The Valiant Navigator (1935)
 Pillars of Society (1935)
 The Castle in Flanders (1936)
 Tomfoolery (1936)
 The Court Concert (1936)
 The Irresistible Man (1937)
 Diamonds (1937)
 Dangerous Game (1937)
 Love Can Lie (1937)
 Serenade (1937)
 A Prussian Love Story (1938)
 Congo Express (1939)
 The Girl at the Reception (1940)
 No Place for Love (1947)
 The Court Concert (1948)

References

Bibliography 
 Chandler, Charlotte. Marlene: Marlene Dietrich, A Personal Biography. Simon and Schuster, 2011.

External links 
 

1871 births
1947 deaths
German film actresses
German stage actresses
German silent film actresses
20th-century German actresses
Actors from Mainz